Schweitzer is a surname. Notable people with the surname include:

 Albert Schweitzer, German theologian, musician, physician, and medical missionary, winner of the 1952 Nobel Peace Prize
 Anton Schweitzer, opera composer
 Brian Schweitzer, former Democratic Governor of the US state of Montana
 Darrell Schweitzer, American writer, editor and essayist
 Douglas Schweitzer, Canadian politician
 Edmund Schweitzer, electrical engineer, inventor
 Edmund O. Schweitzer Jr., founder of E. O. Schweitzer Manufacturing
 George K. Schweitzer, academic in chemistry and family history and local history
 Georgia Schweitzer, former collegiate and professional basketball player
 Jean Baptista von Schweitzer, German politician and poet
 Jeff Schweitzer, American non-fiction author, scientist and political commentator
 Johann Friedrich Schweitzer, Dutch-German alchemist
 Louis Schweitzer (philanthropist), paper manufacturer
 Louis Schweitzer (CEO), chairman and former CEO of Renault
 Mary Higby Schweitzer, paleontologist
 Marlis Schweitzer, Canadian theatre and performance historian
 Paul A. Schweitzer (born 1937), American mathematician
 Pierre-Paul Schweitzer, managing director of the International Monetary Fund
 Scott Schweitzer, American soccer coach and former professional soccer player
 Wes Schweitzer, American football player for the Washington Commanders
 Yoram Schweitzer, senior research fellow at Israel's Institute for National Security Studies

See also
 Schweitzer Mountain Resort, a ski resort in Idaho
 Schweizer (disambiguation)
 Hôpital Albert Schweitzer – a hospital in Gabon
 Schweitzer Engineering Laboratories, a power systems protection company
 Schweitzer (film)
The Doctor (Star Trek), who names himself Schweitzer in one episode

German-language surnames
Ethnonymic surnames